Alois Krof (8 July 1903 – 1935) was a Czech long-distance runner. He competed for Czechoslovakia in the marathon at the 1928 Summer Olympics.

In 1927, Krof was Czechoslovakia's national marathon champion and finished second, behind Hungary's József Galambos, in the Košice Peace Marathon (founded 1924), which Galambos won four times between 1927 and 1933.

References

External links
 
 

1903 births
1935 deaths
Athletes (track and field) at the 1928 Summer Olympics
Czech male long-distance runners
Czech male marathon runners
Olympic athletes of Czechoslovakia
Place of birth missing